Anthony Gareljich (born 20 September 1946) is a New Zealand retired professional wrestler, better known by his ring name, Tony Garea. He is best known for his appearances in the United States with the World Wide Wrestling Federation/World Wrestling Federation in the 1970s and 1980s.

Early life 
The son of Croatian-born Ivan Gareljich, Anthony Gareljich was born in Auckland, New Zealand to parents of Yugoslavian and Irish descent. He was originally an accomplished sprinter and a rugby player.

Professional wrestling career

Early career
Garea was trained by Wild Don Scott. He made his professional wrestling debut in his native New Zealand. He worked in the NWA San Francisco territory where he and Pat Patterson defeated Don Muraco and Invader I for the NWA San Francisco Tag Team Championship in May 1976.

World Wide Wrestling Federation / World Wrestling Federation

Debut and early tag team championship reigns (1972–1979)
Garea left New Zealand in 1972 and went to the United States where he signed a contract with Vince McMahon, Sr.'s World Wide Wrestling Federation (WWWF). He made his WWWF debut at a TV taping in the Philadelphia Arena on 20 September 1972 as a babyface, defeating Davey O'Hannon. On 30 May 1973, he teamed with Haystacks Calhoun and defeated Mr. Fuji and Professor Toru Tanaka to win his first WWWF World Tag Team Championship. Garea and Calhoun feuded with Fuji and Tanaka for the rest of the summer before losing the titles back to Fuji and Tanaka on 11 September.

Garea continued the feud with Fuji and Tanaka with a new partner, Dean Ho. On 14 November, Garea and Ho defeated Fuji and Tanaka for Garea's second and Ho's first WWWF World Tag Team Championship. Garea's second tag team reign was longer and better than his first reign. They held the titles for five and a half months before losing them to the Valiant Brothers (Jimmy and Johnny) on 8 May 1974 episode of All Star Wrestling. They continued teaming for a while before disbanding their tag team and working on their own. Garea, who had been successful as a tag team wrestler, began a singles career.

Garea continued his singles career for three years before forming a tag team with new partner Larry Zbyzsko in August 1977. They began teaming after entering a tag team tournament for the vacant tag titles, where they were defeated by Mr. Fuji and Toru Tanaka in the finals on 27 September 1977. They continued to challenge for the titles before defeating The Yukon Lumberjacks (Eric and Pierre) for Garea's third and Zbyzsko's first WWWF World Tag Team Championship on edition of 21 November 1978 of Championship Wrestling. They held the titles for four months before losing them to Valiant Brothers (Jerry and Johnny) on edition of 24 March 1979 of Championship Wrestling. Later that same month, Wide was dropped from the promotion's name, renaming the promotion World Wrestling Federation.

Teaming with Rick Martel (1980–1982)
Garea continued to wrestle in the tag team division, with another former WWF Tag Team Champion Rene Goulet. The two participated in a tag team tournament for the titles, where they were defeated by The Wild Samoans (Afa and Sika) in the finals on 27 September 1980. Garea formed a tag team with new partner Rick Martel, which was Garea's most successful and most popular tag team. They defeated Wild Samoans on 8 November for Garea's fourth and Martel's first WWF Tag Team Championship. Garea and Martel continued to feud with the former champions for the rest of the year. After Wild Samoans left WWF, the champions began feuding with The Moondogs (King and Rex). They dropped the titles to Moondogs on edition of 17 March 1981 of Championship Wrestling.

Martel and Garea continued to feud with Moondogs, trying to regain the titles. On 8 June, Garea beat a young rookie named Man Mountain Canyon in Madison Square Garden, who returned to WWF four years later as King Kong Bundy. On edition of 21 July of Championship Wrestling, Martel and Garea defeated Moondogs in a rematch to win their second WWF Tag Team Championship as a team, though, it was Garea's fifth and final individual reign. Garea's final run as a tag team champion ended on edition of 17 October of Championship Wrestling after Garea and Martel were defeated by Mr. Fuji and Mr. Saito for the tag titles. Garea and Martel continued to feud with Fuji and Saito, trying to regain the titles but failed to do so.

Martel left WWF in 1982 while Garea went on his own. Garea teamed with newcomers to the WWF such as Eddie Gilbert and B. Brian Blair in 1983 and 1984, but was unable to recapture the success he previously enjoyed as a tag-team champion. He moved to the jobber to the stars status, jobbing to rising newcomers before retiring in 1986.

Retirement (1986-present) 
He thereafter worked as a road agent for the WWF until leaving the Company in 2014.  He appeared with former tag team partner Rick Martel at Vengeance: Night of Champions in June 2007. They came to the aid of the team of Sgt. Slaughter and Jimmy Snuka, who were being attacked following their losing to Deuce 'n Domino.

When WWE came to New Zealand on 11 June 2008 in Auckland, Garea was a guest on the first international V.I.P Lounge along with Bushwacker Butch. The segment's host, Montel Vontavious Porter (MVP) announced him as Bushwhacker Luke but then apologized. Eventually, MVP attacked Butch and Garea with the microphone. Butch and Garea recovered and fought off MVP, then celebrated with the Bushwhacker walk. On 3 March 2009 he was featured on WWE.com exclusive segment Top-rope Theater posing as "Hacksaw" Jim Duggan. On 29 March 2010 episode of Monday Night Raw Garea appeared as a lumberjack in the Christian vs. Ted DiBiase lumberjack match. Towards the end of the match, Garea brawled with other legends that were serving as lumberjacks.

Championships and accomplishments 
Big Time Wrestling (San Francisco)
NWA World Tag Team Championship (San Francisco version) (1 time) – with Pat Patterson
 Pro Wrestling Illustrated
PWI Rookie of the Year (1973) tied with Bob Orton, Jr.
PWI ranked him #236 of the top 500 best singles wrestlers during the PWI Years in 2003
PWI ranked him #74 of the top 100 tag teams with Rick Martel during the PWI Years in 2003
Universal Wrestling Association
UWA World Junior Heavyweight Championship (1 time)
 World Wide Wrestling Federation / World Wrestling Federation
WWWF/WWF World Tag Team Championship (5 times) – with Haystacks Calhoun (1 time), Dean Ho (1 time), Larry Zbyszko (1 time), and Rick Martel (2 times)

References

External links
 
 

1946 births
Living people
New Zealand male professional wrestlers
New Zealand people of Croatian descent
Professional wrestling executives
Sportspeople from Auckland
20th-century New Zealand people
21st-century New Zealand people
20th-century professional wrestlers